Joel Silva (born 14 September 1985) is a Venezuelan volleyball player. He competed in the men's tournament at the 2008 Summer Olympics.

References

1985 births
Living people
Venezuelan men's volleyball players
Olympic volleyball players of Venezuela
Volleyball players at the 2008 Summer Olympics
People from Apure
20th-century Venezuelan people
21st-century Venezuelan people